The Madrid Academic Orchestra (Orquesta Académica de Madrid in Spanish), founded in 1997, is an orchestra based in Madrid, Spain.

History
Founded in 1997 by its current conductor, Iñigo Pírfano, the Madrid Academic Orchestra was created to offer an orchestra platform for young professionals to play in a full professional orchestra.

See also 
 Madrid Symphony Orchestra
 Spanish National Orchestra
 RTVE Symphony Orchestra
 Teatro Real
 National Auditorium of Music
 Teatro Monumental
 Zarzuela
 Teatro de la Zarzuela

References

External links
 Official web site

Spanish orchestras
Musical groups established in 1997